SM Lifestyle Centre is the second shopping mall in Xiamen, Fujian, China after SM City Xiamen and it is also the 4th China mall expansion of SM Prime Holdings in the whole country with  retail space. It is owned and operated by SM Prime Holdings, under the management of Henry Sy, a Filipino-Chinese business tycoon.

See also
SM Prime Holdings
Other SM Malls in China
SM City Jinjiang
SM City Chengdu

References

Shopping malls in Xiamen
SM Prime